The Lucky Galah (2018) is a novel by Australian author Tracy Sorensen.

Plot summary 
The Lucky Galah is set in a fictional remote coastal town named Port Badminton in Western Australia in the year 1969. The story is narrated by a galah named Lucky who can receive signals from satellite dishes (based on OTC Satellite Earth Station Carnarvon).

Reviews 
 ABC Radio National Debut writers series: The Lucky Galah
 Newtown Review of Books TRACY SORENSEN The Lucky Galah. Reviewed by Michelle McLaren
Australian Book Review

Awards 
 The UTS Glenda Adams Award for New Writing (2019 NSW Premier's Literary Awards) — Shortlisted
 The Readings Prize for New Australian Fiction (2018) — Shortlisted
 The Indie Book Award for Debut Fiction (2019) — Longlisted
 Russell Prize (2019) — Shortlisted
 Miles Franklin Award (2019) — Longlisted

References

2018 Australian novels
Novels by Tracy Sorensen
Novels set in Western Australia
Fiction set in 1969